Hylas is a Greek mythological figure.

"Hylas" may also refer to:
 One of the two protagonists from Three Dialogues between Hylas and Philonous and from Dialogs by Stanislaw Lem
 HYLAS, a series of British communications satellites
 HYLAS-1
 HYLAS-2
 HYLAS-3
 HYLAS-4
 Hylas Yachts, a Taiwanese yachts manufacturer

See also 
 Halas (disambiguation)
 Hyas (disambiguation)
 Hyles (disambiguation)